Tony Dean may refer to:

 Tony Dean (conservationist) (1940–2008), American outdoors broadcaster, activist and conservationist
 Tony Dean (Canadian politician) (born 1953), Canadian Senator and former Ontario civil servant
 Tony Dean (Australian politician) (born 1954), Australian politician
 Tony Dean (rugby league) (1949–2014), English rugby league footballer who played in the 1960s, 1970s and 1980s, and coached in the 1980s
 Tony Dean (racing driver) (1932–2008), British former racing driver
 Anthony Dean (cyclist) (born 1991), Australian Olympic BMX racer
 Anthony M. Dean, American engineer

See also
 Anthony Deane (disambiguation)